Josh Lerner is an American economist known for his research in venture capital, private equity, and innovation and entrepreneurship. He is the Jacob H. Schiff Professor of Investment Banking at the Harvard Business School.

Early life
Josh Lerner graduated from Yale University, and he earned a PhD in Economics from Harvard University.

Career
Lerner worked for the Brookings Institution. He was also a research fellow in the International Security program at the Belfer Center for Science and International Affairs in 1990-1991. He later joined the faculty at the Harvard Business School, where he was eventually promoted as the Jacob H. Schiff Professor of Investment Banking. He is a member of the European Corporate Governance Institute.

Lerner is the author of several books. He won the Axiom Business Book Award and the PROSE Award for Excellence in Business for Boulevard of Broken Dreams in 2009.

Between 2008 and 2010 Lerner was a member of the Advisory Board of The Abraaj Group and a paid consultant to the firm until 2017. As well as authoring HBS case studies on the firm and leading the Abraaj Academy, Lerner wrote a report used by Abraaj as a validation of its own questionable portfolio valuation methodologies, later described by Lerner as an inadvertent mistake. Abraaj filed for provisional liquidation in 2018 with the founder Arif Naqvi the subject of a criminal investigation in the United States for the misappropriation of $250 million in investor funding.

Selected publications

Books
Lerner is an author and co-author of several books including:

References

Living people
Yale University alumni
Harvard University alumni
Harvard Business School faculty
20th-century American economists
21st-century American economists
Year of birth missing (living people)